The King's Cup is a yachting race.

Winners
Year, yacht, owner
 1906, Effort (yacht), F. M. Smith
 1907, Queen (yacht), John Rogers Maxwell
 1908, Avenger (yacht), Robert Wales Emmons II
 1909, Istalena (yacht), George Mallory Pynchon
 1939, Resolute, Charles Francis Adams III

References

Sailing competitions